There are several lakes named Mud Lake within the U.S. state of North Dakota.

 Mud Lake, Barnes County, North Dakota.		
 Mud Lake, Barnes County, North Dakota.		
 Mud Lake, Benson County, North Dakota.		
 Mud Lake, Benson County, North Dakota.		
 Mud Lake, Bottineau County, North Dakota.		
 Mud Lake, Bottineau County, North Dakota.		
 Mud Lake, Kidder County, North Dakota.		
 Mud Lake, Kidder County, North Dakota.		
 Mud Lake, McIntosh County, North Dakota.		
 Mud Lake, McLean County, North Dakota.		
 Mud Lake, Sheridan County, North Dakota.		
 Mud Lake, Stutsman County, North Dakota.

References
USGS-U.S. Board on Geographic Names

External links
 GNIS Query 

Lakes of North Dakota